The 2013–14 BYU–Hawaii Seasiders men's basketball team will represent BYU-Hawaii in the 2013–14 NCAA Division II college basketball season. This will be head coach Ken Wagner's twenty-fourth season at BYU-Hawaii. The Seasiders are members of the Pacific West Conference and will play their home games at the George Q. Cannon Activities Center.

2013–14 media
The Seasiders will have every home game televised in various fashions. All home games will be shown on BYUtv or on the BYU-Hawaii Seasiders Livestream Channel. All road games will have an internet audio broadcast available through BYU-Hawaii Radio, and some road games will be streamed online through the opposition's online video providers. D2 teams can also appear on CBS Sports Network as part of the D2 game of the week.

Recruiting

Roster

Schedule

|-
!colspan=12 style="background:#FFCC00; color:#990000;"| Exhibition

|-
!colspan=12 style="background:#990000; color:#FFCC00;"| Regular Season

|-
!colspan=12 style="background:#990000; color:#FFCC00;"| 2014 Pac West Tournament

References

BYU–Hawaii Seasiders men's basketball seasons
2013 in sports in Hawaii
2014 in sports in Hawaii
BYU